Bisto is a popular and well-known brand of gravy and other food products in the United Kingdom and Ireland, currently owned by Premier Foods.

History
The first Bisto product, in 1908, was a meat-flavoured gravy powder which rapidly became a bestseller in the UK. It was added to gravies to thicken them and give a richer taste and aroma. Invented by Messrs Roberts & Patterson, it was named "Bisto" because it "Browns, Seasons and Thickens in One".

Bisto Granules, which dissolve in hot water to form a gravy substitute, were introduced in 1979.

As of 2005, Bisto Gravy Granules had a British market share of over 70%. Nearly all British grocery outlets stock a Bisto product.

Products
As of 2022, in addition to the original gravy powder the company also produces the following products.

Gravy granules range

 Beef 
 Beef (reduced salt)
 Beef (gluten-free)
 Chicken 
 Chicken (reduced salt)
 Chicken (gluten-free)
 Turkey 
 Vegetable 
 Onion 
 Southern style
 American hot & spicy
 Swedish Style Meatball
 Pigs In Blankets (bacon flavour; 2022 limited edition)

Bisto Best range 
In 1991, Bisto launched a new, more expensive granules product. Packaged in a glass jar, it offered a fuller flavour than the standard granules.

 Beef 
 Beef (reduced salt)
 Chicken 
 Chicken (reduced salt)
 Turkey 
 Pork 
 Lamb 
 Vegetable 
 Caramelised Onion

Gravy pots range 
A range of ready to use microwavable pots.

 Chip Shop Gravy
 Chip Shop Curry Sauce
 Spicy Pepper Sauce
 Katsu Curry Sauce

Sauce mixes range 

 Cheese sauce
 Parsley sauce
 White sauce
 Curry sauce

Frozen foods 
Produced under licence by Kerry Foods except where stated.

 Yorkshire puddings (manufactured by Greencore)
 Cottage pie
 Bangers and mash
 Roast chicken dinner
 Roast beef dinner
 Shepherd's pie
 Beef in gravy
 Spaghetti bolognese
 Meat free spaghetti bolognese
 Roast lamb dinner
 Chips in curry sauce
 Chilli con carne
 Lasagne

Advertising

Bisto is notable both for the age of its brand and for the advertising campaigns it has used. In 1919, the Bisto Kids (created by illustrator Will Owen (1869–1957)) appeared in newspapers and soon became popular. The Bisto Kids were a boy and girl in ragged clothes, who would be illustrated catching the odour of Bisto on the breeze and exhale longingly, "Ah, Bisto!"

The Bisto Kids were also part of more elaborate advertising campaigns in later years. The Bisto Kids have not been included in Bisto advertising since 1996. 

Many Bisto adverts shown on television through the years on British and Irish television are available on websites such as YouTube, Dailymotion, Classic TV Adverts, Retro TV Adverts, History of Advertising Trust, Vimeo and TV Ark.

1930s 
In Birmingham in the 1930s a competition was held to choose a name for the two Bisto twin characters, a boy and a girl smelling Bisto's gravy. The competition was won by Mr and Mrs Simmonds, who named the twins after themselves, calling them Bill and Maree.

1950s 
During the 1950s "Bisto For All Meat Dishes" was one of their first television advertisements.

1960s 
During the 1960s adverts included "Pass The Gravy Pass The Bisto" and "Does Cooking Proud". At the end of the decade television adverts changed from monochrome to colour. Bobby Moore featured in the first colour advert for Bisto gravy in 1969.

1970s 
During the 1970s popular advert phrases included "Where there's Meat theres Bisto" and "Brown Seasons And Thickens All in One" in a series of family adverts shown on television with celebrities such as Gordon Banks, Anita Harris, Henry Cooper, John Pertwee, Billy Bremner, Dick Emery, Terry Wogan and Alan Ball.

1980s 
During the 1980s, the company released a series of ads in the UK which featured a song that included the recurring phrases like, "You Can't Kid A Bisto Kid" adverts that featured 1) Sandcastles 1980, 2) Bisto kids jumping out the window, also Bisto kids jumping off a slide in 1981 and 3) Family in 1982, "Much More Ahh" series with Lysette Anthony and Tarzan in 1984, Monkey's and Ghosts in a Halloween edition in 1985, "Never in a month of Sundays" series of 3 adverts 1) Car in the 1983 advert, 2) Mole featured Chris Wilkinson in the 1984 advert and 3) Music Playing in 1985 advert, "Now You're Home" an advert with a bus and school dinners ran (1987–1990), "Only Bisto Puts The Ahh into Gravy", "Insist On Bisto" was a series of family adverts, rectory and bistro, "For A Winner Of A Dinner" shown in Ireland only in 1987 and "When It's Dry Let It Pour".

In 1984 RHM Foods launched a nationwide competition to find children to act the role of the Bisto Kids, the recurrent "The Bisto Kids of the Year Awards".  The first ever competition was won by Hayley Griffiths and Jimmy Endicott from Doncaster. They were six years old at the time and became the faces of Bisto, both for public relations and marketing events, and also appeared in an advert shown on prime time TV to find the next Bisto Kids.
 
Bisto sponsored the ITV Telethon in 1988.

1990s 
Adverts for Bisto gravy during the 1990s included the Dean Martin song Memories Are Made Of This. Other phrases were "Real Gravy in No Time at All", Vanessa Williams in a series of adverts called Save the Best for Last for Bisto Best range (1993–1996) and "It Put's The Ahh into A Meal" series (1990–1992) and a series with Julie Walters (1996–1998). In a 1993 advert for Bisto Fuller Flavour Gravy Granules a young couple for dinner on a train featured the Orient Express just before rebranded as Bisto Best.

2000s 
During the 2000s adverts including in the early part of the decade "Gravy Matters" series of adverts (1999–2002) in Great Britain only, 100 years in 2008, Make A Great Meal Special shown in Ireland only.

2010s 
During the 2010s adverts including "Now You're Talking". 

The company sponsors the Bisto Book of the Year Awards in the Republic of Ireland.

The latest campaign for Bisto encourages families to sit up at the table for one night a week to eat 'proper' food.

Ownership
Bisto has had several owners since its creation.  It is currently owned by Premier Foods, which acquired Bisto when it bought Rank Hovis McDougall in March 2007 to form the largest UK foods manufacturing company.

Competition
Bisto's main competitor is Goldenfry Foods Ltd, which makes a branded gravy as well as most supermarket own-brand gravies.

References

External links
Bisto website
Bisto brand page at Premier Foods website
Bisto for Caterers on the RHM Foodservice website 
BBC article

British brands
Premier Foods brands
British condiments
Brand name condiments
Instant foods and drinks